Tracy Young Cannon (July 23, 1879 – November 6, 1961) was an American Latter-day Saint musician, composer, and musicologist.

Early life
Cannon was born in Salt Lake City, Utah Territory. He was the son of George Q. Cannon and his wife Caroline Young.

Cannon joined the Mormon Tabernacle Choir at the age of 15.  Cannon became the director of the Cannon Ward choir at age 16. He studied piano composition under John J. McClellan. He later studied in Ann Arbor, Michigan, Berlin, Paris, New York City, and Chicago. In New York City he studied with Pietro Yon, organist of St. Patrick's Cathedral. He received an honorary Master of Music degree from the Chicago Music College in 1930.

Leadership in The Church of Jesus Christ of Latter-day Saints
In 1909, Cannon became assistant organist for the Mormon Tabernacle Choir. He served in this position for 21 years. In 1930, Cannon served as the organist for the presentation of The Message of the Ages.

In 1920, Cannon was appointed to the General Music Committee of the Church of Jesus Christ of Latter-day Saints (LDS Church). In 1939, he was made second assistant to Melvin J. Ballard, supervisor of the committee.

From 1915 to 1927, Cannon was a member of the high council of the Pioneer Stake of the LDS Church. In 1917, he became a member of the Deseret Sunday School Union General Board. From 1930 through 1936, Cannon was bishop of the Cannon Ward in Salt Lake City.

Cannon was an editor of the 1927 LDS Church hymnal.

In 1925, Cannon was appointed director of the McCune School of Music and Art. He served in this position until 1950.

Cannon wrote The Organist's Manual.

Compositions
In the 1985 English edition of the LDS hymnal, the following hymns are by Cannon:
9 "Come, Rejoice" (Words and music)
20 "God of Power, God of Right" (music)
73 "Praise the Lord with Heart and Voice" (words and music)
161 "The Lord Be with Us" (music)
167 "Come, Let Us Sing an Evening Hymn" (music)
234 "Jesus, Mighty King in Zion" (music)
288 "How Beautiful Thy Temples, Lord" (music)

Notes

References
Ludlow, Daniel H. Encyclopedia of Mormonism p. 976

1879 births
1961 deaths
American Latter Day Saint hymnwriters
American leaders of the Church of Jesus Christ of Latter-day Saints
Burials at Salt Lake City Cemetery
Cannon family
Musicians from Salt Lake City
Richards–Young family
Sunday School (LDS Church) people
Tabernacle Choir members
Tabernacle Choir organists